The 41 cm/45 3rd Year Type naval gun was a  breech-loading naval gun designed during World War I for the Imperial Japanese Navy. It served as the primary armament in the  dreadnoughts completed after the end of the war and in coast defense mountings.

Description
This used the Elswick three-motion short-arm mechanism, much like the British BL 18 inch Mk I naval gun designed around the same time.

Initially the gun was fitted in twin-gun turrets that had an elevation range of –2°/+35°. A special Type 3 Sankaidan incendiary shrapnel shell was developed in the 1930s for anti-aircraft use. The gun's firing cycle was one round every 24 seconds.

The turrets aboard the Nagato-class ships were replaced in the mid-1930s, using the turrets stored from the unfinished s.

The gun was only initially known as the 41 cm/45 3rd Year Type naval gun before it was redesignated as the 40 cm/45 3rd Year Type naval gun on 29 March 1922 to comply with the terms of the Washington Naval Treaty which forbade guns larger than 40.6 cm (16 in). Third year type refers to the Welin breech block on which design began in 1914, the third year of the Taishō period. This breech block design was also used on the 20 cm (7.9 inch), 15.5 cm (6.1 inch), 14 cm (5.5 inch), 12.7 cm (5 inch), and 12 cm (4.7 inch) naval guns.

Service
The Nagato-class dreadnoughts were the only ships to use this gun, although it would have been used by the Tosa-class and  dreadnoughts as well as the s had they not been cancelled due to the Washington Naval Treaty of 1922. The gun was also deployed in three coast-defense turrets intended to close off the Strait of Tsushima. One turret each was deployed on Iki and Tsushima Islands while the third was mounted in Pusan, Korea.

Mutsu’s original number 4 turret, removed during her interwar refit, is on display on the grounds of the former Imperial Japanese Naval Academy at Etajima, Hiroshima, where it was placed as a training aid in the 1930s. The two aft turrets from Mutsus wreck were salvaged in the 1970s; No. 4 in July or August 1970 and No. 3 in September of the following year. Both were scrapped. One gun from Turret No. 3 is at the Kure Maritime Museum, popularly known as the Yamato Museum, in Kure, Hiroshima while the other is at the Museum of Maritime Science in Odaiba, Tokyo.

Shells into bombs
Obsolete Type 88 shells were modified in 1939–40 to create the Type 99 No. 80 Mk 5 armor-piercing bomb used during the attack on Pearl Harbor. The armor-piercing cap and windscreen were removed, the body was machined down and tapered to reduce weight and a new, thinner, base plug installed with two fuzes.

Beginning in 1942 an improved version of the bomb was built. Its nose was much less thick and it contained  of trinitroanisole.

See also

Weapons of comparable role, performance and era
 BL 16 inch Mk I naval gun: British equivalent
 16"/45 caliber Mk 1, 5 & 8 gun: American equivalent

Notes

References

External links

 41 cm/45 3rd Year Type on navweaps.com

 

World War II naval weapons
Naval guns of Japan
400 mm artillery
 Military equipment introduced in the 1920s